Nikita Sergeyevich Krivtsov (born 18 August 2002) is a Russian football player. He plays as a attacking midfielder for FC Krasnodar.

Club career
He made his debut in the Russian Football National League for FC Tom Tomsk on 27 February 2021 in a game against FC Alania Vladikavkaz and scored a goal on his debut.

He made his Russian Premier League debut for FC Krasnodar on 13 September 2021 in a game against FC Rostov.

International career
Krivtsov was called up to the Russia national football team for the first time for a friendly against Kyrgyzstan in September 2022.

Career statistics

Club

References

External links
 
 Profile by Russian Football National League

2002 births
People from Dzerzhinsk, Russia
Sportspeople from Nizhny Novgorod Oblast
Living people
Russian footballers
Russia under-21 international footballers
Association football midfielders
FC Torpedo Vladimir players
FC Tom Tomsk players
FC Krasnodar-2 players
FC Krasnodar players
Russian First League players
Russian Second League players
Russian Premier League players